Toase is a town in the Ashanti Region of Ghana. The town is known for the Toase Secondary School.  The school is a second cycle institution.

References

Populated places in the Ashanti Region